Asansol Lok Sabha constituency is one of the 543 parliamentary constituencies in India. The constituency centres on Asansol in West Bengal. All the seven assembly segments of No. 40 Asansol Lok Sabha constituency are in Paschim Bardhaman district.

Overview

On the eve of 2014 elections, The Statesman described the constituency as follows: "The Asansol Lok Sabha constituency is conspicuous by its mixed population — coal mine workers, factory workers, coal mafia, scrap dealers, minority population and a large section of Hindi speaking population." The New Indian Express said that the constituency was dotted with coal mines and 50% of the electorate was Hindi speaking. The Statesman has put the proportion of non-Bengali voters in the constituency at 36%.

The United News of India (UNI) has been candid about the second largest city and urban agglomeration in West Bengal after Kolkata that is a hub of coal mining and railway activity bordering Jharkhand. Asansol has seen, it writes, “a sustained hold over it by the CPI(M) since 1984 (1989?). Before that it was a tale of fluctuating fortune for the CPI(M) and the Congress... However, as the green surge swept Bengal to demolish the red bastion in 2011 Assembly elections... Moreover, as the Left still remained cornered in state politics, their neutralised voters are increasingly migrating to the BJP for a viable alternative.”

The modernisation and expansion programme of IISCO Steel Plant, in this constituency, was completed at a cost of over 16,000 crores. As of 2015, it was the single largest investment in West Bengal till then.

Assembly segments
As per order of the Delimitation Commission issued in 2006 in respect of the delimitation of constituencies in West Bengal, parliamentary constituency no. 40 Asansol is composed of the following assembly segments:
 
Before delimitation, Asansol Lok Sabha constituency was composed of the following assembly segments: Kulti (assembly constituency no. 257), Barabani (assembly constituency no. 258), Hirapur (assembly constituency no. 259), Asansol (assembly constituency no. 260), Raniganj (assembly constituency no. 261), Jamuria (assembly constituency no. 262) and Ukhra (SC) (assembly constituency no. 263)

Members of Parliament

Note: In 1951 the Asansol area was part of Burdwan Lok Sabha constituency. In 1957, it was double seat constituency.

Election results

By-election 2022

General election 2019

General election 2014

General election 2009

2005 Bye-election
In the Asansol seat, the by-election was held due to the death of the sitting CPI(M)-MP Bikash Chowdhury on 1 August 2005.
The Bye election Held On 5 September 2005.Bansa Gopal Chowdhury of CPI(M) defeated Moloy Ghatak of Trinamool Congress.

General elections 1957-2014
Most of the contests were multi-cornered. However, only winners and runners-up are mentioned below:

See also
 List of Constituencies of the Lok Sabha

References

Lok Sabha constituencies in West Bengal
Politics of Paschim Bardhaman district